Beni Ebeid is a city in the Dakahlia Governorate, Egypt. Its population is 45,157 people as of 2020.

The older name of the city is Disa.

References 

Populated places in Dakahlia Governorate